Ilanga norfolkensis is a species of sea snail, a marine gastropod mollusk in the family Solariellidae.

Description

Distribution

References

 

norfolkensis
Gastropods described in 1999